Józef Krudowski (18 January 1881 – 7 August 1943) was a Polish composer. His work was part of the music event in the art competition at the 1932 Summer Olympics. He was murdered in the Auschwitz concentration camp during World War II.

References

External links
 

1881 births
1943 deaths
Polish composers
Olympic competitors in art competitions
People from Mława
Polish people who died in Auschwitz concentration camp
Polish civilians killed in World War II